D&G Bus is a bus operator based in Adderley Green. They operate local & interurban services around Stoke-on-Trent, Cheshire, Staffordshire, Derbyshire & Greater Manchester. It is a subsidiary of Centrebus

History
D&G Bus was formed by David Reeves and Gerald Henderson in April 1998 initially operating four buses on two routes under contract to Stoke-on-Trent City Council. It expanded with both route and school services in Cheshire and Staffordshire with 16 buses by the end of 1998. In April 2005 D&G Bus purchased Wednesfield based Midland. In 2006 following Gerald Henderson's sudden death Julian Peddle purchased Henderson's shareholding in the business.

In August 2011 the Staffordshire business was sold to Wardle Transport with 46 routes, 30 buses and the Adderley Green depot. In September 2011 D&G Bus and Julian Peddle purchased South Lancs Travel in Atherton, Greater Manchester. In August 2012 the Midland business was sold to Arriva Midlands with 61 buses. In December 2014, the route operations of BakerBus were purchased with nine buses.

In March 2015, D&G sold South Lancs Travel to Rotala and in May 2015 purchased Wardle Transport back from Arriva Midlands with 19 buses. In April 2016, D&G took over six routes from Routemaster Buses. In September 2016 D&G Bus took over the rest of the routes which Routemaster Buses had operated.  In October 2016 D&G were awarded new five-year contracts for eight Cheshire East routes which were operated by GHA Coaches prior to its collapse including the 88 Altrincham to Knutsford via Wilmslow service.  However, most of these contracts were annulled 18 months later as part of Cheshire East council's bus review.

In December 2019, Julian Peddle's Centrebus Group purchased David Reeves shareholding in D&G bus, at present it will continue to operate as a separate unit from Centrebus.

Criticism
Following Cheshire East bus review, many subsided bus routes were cut back from April 2018 and as a result D&G Bus also reviewed their commercial bus services within Cheshire East.  For example, up until April 2018 the 88 Altrincham to Knutsford via Wilmslow contracted service had operated half-hourly, while a 300 Knutsford circular service commercial service also operated half-hourly.  Following the 88 contract being reduced to hourly (and remaining with D&G Bus), D&G Bus withdrew the 300 service and registered an hourly 88A Knutsford to Colshaw Farm via Longridge service which retained a roughly half-hourly frequency between Knutsford and Wilmslow but halved the number of services along certain roads in Knutsford.  They also registered a 130 Macclesfield to Manchester Airport service in response to the 200 service being withdrawn and Arriva reducing the frequency of the 130 Macclesfield to East Didsbury service.  However, within 3 months of changing their commercial service in Cheshire East they cancelled most of their commercial services in the borough.  D&G had also previously registered a 378 Wilmslow to Handforth Dean service in response to Stagecoach withdrawing the service but again promptly withdrew the new service.

Fleet
As of January 2023, the fleet consisted of 92 buses. Fleet livery was originally cream and blue, it has since been replaced by a red with yellow signwriting scheme. The fleet also consists of 46 ex Arriva Midlands vehicles (still in Arriva colours) which were included in the purchase of Cannock Depot. These vehicles have had Chaserider markings applied over the Arriva markings.

Routes
D&G Bus operates services mainly around North Staffordshire and South Cheshire.

Chaserider

In November 2020, D&G announced they would be taking over the Cannock depot of Arriva Midlands from January 2021 with operations in Cannock and Stafford running under the Chaserider brand.

Chaserider operates as a subsidiary of D&G with different ticketing arrangements and operates a separate website, similar to the way Arriva owned Yorkshire Tiger operated in West Yorkshire but unlike Yorkshire Tiger, Chaserider has a similar livery to its parent.

References

External links

Company website
Flickr gallery

Bus operators in Cheshire
Bus operators in Staffordshire
Transport companies established in 1998
1998 establishments in England